The Longxing Monastery or Longxing Temple is an ancient Buddhist monastery located in the town of Zhengding in Hebei Province, China, approximately  north of the provincial capital of Shijiazhuang. It has been referred to as the "Best Temple south of Beijing".

History

The monastery was first built in AD 586, during the Sui dynasty. Its original name was Longcang monastery. One of the oldest stelas on the grounds of the monastery, the "Longcangsi Stele", dates from the year the monastery's foundation. Much of it was reconstructed during the Song dynasty (AD 960–1279). Today, the Longxing Temple is open to the public as a museum.

Landscape 

Following a common pattern, the monastery complex features a central axis along which a sequence of buildings and focal points is arranged. The first building is the Hall of the Four Heavenly Kings. At the opposite end of the axis is the Tower of Great Mercy, a -high wooden structure, which houses a  bronze statue of Guanyin cast during the early years of the Song dynasty. Inside the hall, a staircase leads around the statue which allows it to be seen from top to bottom.

Other notable artworks of the monastery include a colorful wooden carving of Guanyin sitting in a grotto and statues of Buddha sitting on a lotus throne.

A unique piece of 12th-century wood architecture from the Song dynasty in the temple is the Pavilion of Zhuanlunzang, which was restored in the 20th century. The pavilion houses a rotating bookshelf which was formerly used to store holy texts and Buddhist sutras. It is the oldest existent rotating repository of its kind.

Architecture 
The whole monastery of Longxing Temple has its gate facing the south. There is a clear axis from the south to the north and all the buildings in the Longxing Temple are aligned to it.

Hall of Four Heavenly Kings

The Hall of Four Heavenly Kings is the first building along the axis of Longxing Temple. It also acts as the main entrance of the whole monastery of Longxing Temple. As is recorded, this hall was built in the early Song dynasty (between AD 982 to AD 988). It was restored several times in history and some of them are recorded, which happened in the 37th year of the Wanli Period, Ming dynasty (AD 1609), 34th year of Kangxi Period, Qing dynasty (AD 1695) and 41st year of Kangxi Period, Qing dynasty (AD 1702). In the 45th year of the Qianlong Period, Qing dynasty (AD 1780), the restoration work tilted the hall to make it face the south as it is today and to be consistent with other major halls. The overall structural style was roughly kept despite all the restorations.

The Hall of Four Heavenly Kings is 23.28m in length and 9.62m in width, with doors on both long sides, facing the south and north. The roof is in the East Asian hip-and-gable roof style, which indicates its status as a high-level temple (roof styles are key elements in ancient Chinese to show the political or religious status of a building.). Four statues of the four heavenly kings, each of 4.8m in height, were worshipped on the east and west end of the hall, two on each side. The original statues were demolished in 1966 and what we see today are made in 1982.

In the center of the hall sits a gilded statue of the Monk Budai which was also called the "Laughing Buddha" or "Fat Buddha" by the locals.

Hall of Dajueliushi (Relics)

The Hall of Dajueliushi is the second hall of the monastery and should have been the main hall (if it didn't collapse), located right to the north of the Hall of Four Heavenly Kings. This hall is dedicated to the six mentors of Shakyamuni, namely Vipassī Buddha, Sikhī Buddha, Vessabhū Buddha, Kakusandha Buddha, Koṇāgamana Buddha and Kasyapa Matanga. In Chinese, the "liushi" (六师) part in its name means "six mentors". There was a statue of Shakyamuni himself accompanied by six statues of the six mentors in the hall and over a hundred small statues of the Arhats and Bodhisattvas. So the locals also refer to this hall as "the hall of the seven buddhas".

The hall was built in the Yuanfeng Period in the Song dynasty (AD 1078–1085) with the hip roof style, which is the highest level of roof styles in ancient China. In the following centuries, it was restored several times. In the early years of the Republic of China, it collapsed due to poor maintenance and war. Now only the stone platform exists, on which the wooden structure stood in history.

The hall is nine Jian (the space between two columns on the façade) by six Jians (53.35m by 35.2m), covering , which is slightly larger than the largest existing Buddhist hall in China, the Main Hall of Fengguo Temple. Nine was the largest number allowed for the Jians of Buddhist halls in the hierarchy system in ancient China. The Hall of "Dajueliush", if still existing, should be the largest and highest-level Buddhist hall all over China.

Mani Hall
The Mani Hall is the third hall along the axis of Longxing Temple and is regarded as the most important one of all the halls in Longxing Temple. The hall was constructed in the 4th year of the Huangyou Period of the Song dynasty (AD 1052). It was one of the most intact building from the Song dynasty in China. and was restored several times in history, among which the restoration in 1977–1980 was the most thorough one.

The East Asian hip-and-gable roof style was used here with two levels of eaves. The floor plan appeared to be almost a regular square but was added with one Baosha (a smaller and loer structure protruding from the main building) on each of the four sides. This combination of square layout, Baosha, and the roof style gave the building a unique exterior appearance, complicated and magnificent. Liang Sicheng, the respected Chinese architect, commented with a surprise when he first saw this hall in 1933: "Except for the coner towers of the Forbidden City, such layout can only be found in the paintings of the Song dynasty. The picturesque elegancy, the solemn and vigorous ancient style gave me an indescribable feeling. In particular, from the perspective of its form, the Mani Hall is overlaying and magnificent, which is indeed one of the finest pieces of architecture art. It broadens our horizon of ancient Chinese architecture."

The structural system of Mani Hall was derived from Yingzao Fashi. The Dougongs drew particular attention from researchers with there large quantity and various styles. The complicated roof was supported by 127 Dougongs, which can be categorized into over 20 styles. For example, the Dougongs supporting the lower eaves are 1.2m in height, equivalent to 1/3 of the column height. Such dimensions Dougongs are typical Song style and can not be found in the Ming or Qing style buildings.

In the center of the hall stands a group of Buddha statues. The gilded Shakyamuni sits in the middle on an octangle Xumi platform with two of his disciples standing on both sides. Besides, Samantabhadra and Manjushri each sits on a lotus-like Xumi platform on the left and right ends of the group.

On the back of the group of statues (the north side), near the north entrance of the hall, where should have been a plain wall like in other similar halls, another group of statues can be seen occupying the whole wall. It is way more complicated and beautiful than the frontal one. Guanyin, the Buddhist figure representing great compassion and mercy in Chinese culture sits elegantly on a colored cloud in the center, with right foot stepping on a lotus, and left leg casually put on the right one. Around Guanyin, the reliefs depict the scene of a colorful mountain in the vast and wavy sea, which is supposed to be the Mount Putuo, where legends say Guanyin manifested itself and inspired people. That's why this statue is also called the "Guanyin in Mountain". This group of statues is unique for making the Buddhist figure look like a kind and pretty lady instead of the traditional serious or solemn image, giving people a closer and even intimate feeling. Some researchers believe this group of statues was made in the 42nd year of the Jiajing Period of the Ming dynasty (AD 1563) according to a tablet embedded in the wall. The famous Chinese writer Lu Xun love this Guanyin statue in particular and put a photo of it on his working desk so as to see it every day. Some opinions say it was built during the Song dynasty.

The inner surfaces of the walls of the Mani Hall are all decorated with fresco. They are painted in the same period when the hall was constructed. All of the frescos depict the Buddhist stories or figures. There were originally  of frescos, of which  remain. They are regarded as some of the finest pieces in the history of Chinese paintings.

Precept Platform

The Precept Platform is the place for monks and worshipers to undertake the precepts of Buddhism and for Buddhist ceremonies.

The platform consists of a two-level square stone platform in the form of Xumi platform (a style of the stone platform in ancient Chinese architecture) and a wooden structure covering it. The first level of the stone platform is 12.93m by 12.93m in layout and 0.88m in height; the second level is 10.35m by 10.35m by 1.16m. The stone platform is believed to be constructed during the Song dynasty.

However, the wooden structure, in the style of a tented roof, shows typical Qing style features, where the Dougongs are small and mainly function as decoration instead of key structural elements. It is inferred that the wooden structure was constructed during the early Qing dynasty.

The stone platform, covered by a wooden structure, sits a bronze double-faced Buddha statue, which was cast in the 6th year of the Hongzhi Period of the Ming dynasty (AD 1493). The south face is Amitābha and the north face is Bhaisajyaguru.

There was a circle of cloister around, which was recorded by Liang Sicheng in 1933 when he did a survey in Longxing Temple. But it can no longer be seen today.

Pavilion of Zhuanlunzang and Pavilion of Maitreya
The Pavilion of Zhuanlunzang and the Pavilion of Maitreya are both two-floor buildings. They are located to the north of the precept platform with the Pavilion of Zhuanlunzang in the west and the Pavilion of Maitreya in the east, face to face. There is no clear record of when these pavilions were constructed. However, judging from the structural features, researchers believe the Pavilion of Zhuanlunzang was constructed during the early Song dynasty, while the Pavilion of Maitreya was built later.

The Pavilion of Zhuanlunzang acted as the library in the monastery. An octagonal Zhuanlunzang (a rotating wooden used as a sutra cabinet) was installed in the center of its ground floor, which remains intact today but is no longer used. Zhuanlunzangs are not rare in history, but an early-built large one that was kept today like this in the Longxing Temple is rarely seen in other parts of the world. To accommodate this Zhuanlunzang, the building adopted some unique structural techniques, including shifting the columns, using some curved beams, etc. This structure system drew particular attention from architects and researchers including Liang Sicheng.

The Pavilion of Maitreya is dedicated to Maitreya. The building has two floors while the first floor is only a circle of passageways. This statue was during the Song dynasty.

Royal Stele Pavilions

The two Royal Stele Pavilions are located in between the Hall of Great Mercy and the Pavilion of Zhuanlunzang and the Pavilion of Maitreya, on both sides of the axis, facing the south. They each cover a royal stele on which engraved an article written by the Emperor.

The east stele shows the article hand-written by the Kangxi Emperor during the 52nd year of the Kangxi Period of the Qing dynasty (AD 1713) both in traditional Chinese and in Manchu characters. The west shows the article by the Qianlong Emperor hand-written in the 45th year of the Qianlong Period of the Qing dynasty (AD 1780). The west one is engraved in four languages: traditional Chinese, Manchu on the front (south) and Tibetan, Mongolian on the back.

Both pavilions are in a regular square floor plan, which is 6.88m by 6.88m 12.97m in height. They have four arch doors on their four sides, allowing people to read the texts on both the front and back sides of the steles. The roofs of the pavilions are in East Asian hip-and-gable roof style, covered with yellow glazed tiles. The color of these tiles manifests the hierarchical status of these pavilions since yellow tiles are only allowed to be used on royal buildings in ancient China.

Tower of Great Mercy
The Tower of Great Mercy is the major hall of the whole monastery of the Longxing Temple, which is the largest building and accommodates the largest Buddha statue.

The tower was constructed during the early Song dynasty and was restored during the Yuan, Ming, and Qing dynasties at the orders of the emperors. In 1933, when Liang Sicheng came to survey the Longxing Temple, he recorded that the Tower of Great Mercy was also called the Foxiang Tower (meaning the Tower of Buddhist Incense). The original tower had already collapsed back then and a new one was under construction. However, the new one, finished in 1944, was designed as a huge but simple brick shrine to cover the bronze statue. The original style was discarded, and the affiliated buildings were ignored due to the limit of fundings. In 1992, the State Bureau of Cultural Relics decided to reconstruct the Tower of Great Mercy and its affiliated buildings. The project finished on September 15, 1999.

The reconstructed tower is in the Song style as is seen today. The tower itself is a -tall three-floor building with East Asian hip-and-gable roof style. The affiliated buildings, Yushu Pavilion and Jiqing Pavilion, in the identical style, structure, and dimensions, stand to the east and west of the Tower of Great Mercy and are connected to the tower with wooden arch bridges on the second floor. They are both -tall two-floor buildings with East Asian hip-and-gable roof style, the ground floor of which are five Jians by four Jians.

The thousand hands and eyes are abstractly represented with 42 arms and one eye on the palm of each hand. This statue is the major and iconic statue of the Longxing Temple. The locals called Longxing Temple "Big Buddha Temple" because of this statue. It is listed as one of "the four preciouses of Hebei Province" (the other three are the Liaodi Pagoda, Anji Bridge, and the Iron Lion of Cangzhou).

The statue was cast in the 4th year of the Kaibao Period of Song dynasty (AD 971) at the order of Emperor Taizu of Song, the founding emperor of the Song dynasty. The emperors in the following dynasties put particular attention to it and ordered several restorations. It was also loved and worshipped by the local people, who often donated money and treasures for the daily maintenance of the statue.

Others

Except for the major buildings mentioned above, there are several other halls and pavilions located behind (to the north of) the Tower of Great Mercy:

Hall of Amitābha is located right to the north of the Tower of Great Mercy. Constructed in the 5th year of the Zhengde Period of the Ming dynasty (AD 1510), it is a single floor building with East Asian hip-and-gable roof. Its dimensions five Jians by four Jians. A statue of Amitābha was worshipped in this hall.
Hall of Vairocana was constructed in 1959 to accommodate the statue of Vairocana moved here in the same year from the Chongyin Temple. The statue,  in height, was finely designed in the appearance of a pagoda. It consists of a thousand individual statues of Vairocana that are divided into three levels. It is the last building on the main axis and marks the north end of it.
Pavilion of Longquan Well is located in the northeast corner of the garden in the north end of the whole monastery. First constructed in the 7th year of the Tianshun Period of the Ming dynasty (AD 1463), it was the only building with a "Lu roof" (a roof style of ancient Chinese architecture with a plain in the top center and four slope roofs around it) in Longxing Temple. It acts as the shelter of an octangle well called "Longquan Well" ("Longquan" means "the spring of the Chinese dragon").
A Paifang is located in between the Mani Hall and the Precept Platform. It is constructed as part of a partition wall that divides the whole monastery of Longxing Temple into two parts, the front (south) part and the major (north) part. Liang Sicheng recorded this paifang as a small but exquisite piece of architecture. The paifang standing there today was reconstructed according to Liang’s record in 1986.

See also

List of Buddhist temples
Chinese Buddhism

References

External links
Longxing Monastery, Architectura Sinica Site Archive
Longxing Temple | govt.chinadaily.com.cn
Longxing Temple | China.org.cn

Buddhist monasteries in China
Buddhist temples in Shijiazhuang
Buildings and structures in Shijiazhuang
Song dynasty architecture
6th-century Buddhist temples
6th-century establishments in China
Religious organizations established in the 6th century
Major National Historical and Cultural Sites in Hebei
Religious buildings and structures completed in 586
Colossal Guanyin statues